"Mirrorball" is a song by American singer-songwriter Taylor Swift, taken from her eighth studio album, Folklore (2020). Swift wrote the song as a tribute to her fans, after she cancelled a planned concert tour to support her seventh studio album Lover (2019). Produced by Swift and co-writer Jack Antonoff, "Mirrorball" is a dream pop, jangle pop, and indie folk song with flavors of country music, accompanied by reverbed, gentle guitars, vocal harmonies, and live drums. Lyrically, the narrator likens herself to a fragile disco ball and sings about doing anything to keep her audience entertained.

In reviews of Folklore, critics interpreted the track as a metaphor for female musicians' struggles to reinvent themselves to stay relevant. They lauded the production and emotional sentiments, with many picking it as an album highlight. "Mirrorball" was listed as one of the best songs of 2020 by Slant Magazine, Pitchfork, and Variety. It peaked at number 26 on the US Billboard Hot 100 and was a top 40 chart entry in Australia, Canada, Malaysia, and Singapore. The song was performed on the Eras Tour (2023) as the surprise song for the opening show in Glendale, Arizona.

Production and release 
Singer-songwriter Taylor Swift had written and produced songs with Jack Antonoff for her previous studio albums 1989 (2014), Reputation (2017), and Lover (2019). They collaborated again on Folklore, which Swift surprise-released amid the COVID-19 pandemic in 2020. Folklore was released on July 24, 2020, through Republic Records. Swift wrote or co-wrote all songs and produced six with Antonoff. On "Mirrorball", Antonoff served as co-writer, programmer, and engineer (with Laura Sisk), and played instruments including acoustic guitar, drums, electric guitar, and Hammond B-3. The track was recorded at Kitty Committee Studio (Swift's home studio) in Beverly Hills, California, and Rough Customer Studio in Brooklyn. Serban Ghenea mixed the song at MixStar Studios in Virginia Beach, Virginia.

Music and lyrics 
"Mirrorball" runs for 3 minutes and 29 seconds. It is a dream pop and jangle pop song with a dense reverb. Jon Caramanica of The New York Times remarked that the production borderlines shoegaze, and Jason Lipshutz from Billboard deemed it an indie folk track. The production incorporates reverbed guitars, a pedal steel, country flavors, breathy vocals, harmonies, and live drums. Swift's vocals are highlighted at the forefront, backed by soft, gentle snare strokes in the background. Spencer Kornharber of The Atlantic wrote that the song features "warm" and "sparkling" guitar tones yet "snowy" tambourine. Mikael Wood from the Los Angeles Times compared the song to the music by such 1990s acts as the Sundays and Sixpence None the Richer for displaying a more feminine side, a counterpart to the album's overarching "beardo indie rock" influence. Willman agreed that "Mirrorball" is one of the album's "least folkloric-sounding tracks".

Whereas much of Folklore explores fictional narratives and departs from Swift's previously well-known autobiographical songwriting, "Mirrorball" is a track that reflects her state of mind during the COVID-19 quarantine. She wrote the track after her planned concert tour for Lover was cancelled on the outbreak of the pandemic. On it, she channeled her realization of how her fans find "solace on the dance floor", and her struggles with celebrity and how to maintain relevance: "It's a metaphor for celebrity, but it’s also a metaphor for so many people who feel like they have to be different versions of themselves for different people." In the lyrics, the narrator sings about how she would do anything to entertain her audience ("All I do is try, try, try I'm still on that trapeze/ I'm still trying everything, to keep you looking at me") and likens herself to a fragile disco ball. Critics interpreted the track to be about Swift's self-awareness of her public image, and about female celebrities' efforts to remain relevant at large.

Critical reception 
In publications' reviews of Folklore, many critics lauded the production and emotional resonance of "Mirrorball". They picked it as an album highlight or even the best album track. Fin McRedmond of The Irish Times said the song is "destined to be an instant Swiftian classic". Descriptions of Swift's songwriting include "dreamy", "devastatingly pretty", "ethereal", and "authentic". In Slant Magazine, Eric Mason admired how "Mirrorball" managed to convey both nostalgia and sarcasm with "breathless amazement". Hannah Mylrea of NME was not as impressed, deeming the track forgettable and saying it drags the album. "Mirrorball" appeared on year-end lists of the best songs of 2020 by Variety'''s Chris Willman, who placed it at number nine on a list of 40 songs, Pitchfork (71st), and Slant Magazine (14th). Rob Sheffield from Rolling Stone ranked it among the five best songs released by Swift. Katherine Flynn from Consequence said that "Mirrorball" should have been the lead single from Folklore.

 Commercial performance 
After the release of Folklore, "Mirrorball" debuted at number 26 on the US Billboard Hot 100 issued for August 8, 2020. The track peaked at number six on Billboard's Hot Rock & Alternative Songs chart, where it stayed for 16 weeks. In the United Kingdom, "Mirrorball" reached number 30 on OCC's Audio Streaming chart and was certified silver by the British Phonographic Industry (BPI). The track peaked on single charts, at number 13 In Singapore, number 14 in Australia and Malaysia, number 22 in Canada, and number 103 in Portugal.

 Personnel 
Credits are adapted from the liner notes of Folklore.''

 Taylor Swift – producing, lead vocals
 Jack Antonoff – recording, programming, producing, acoustic guitar, drums, electric guitar, Hammond B-3, keyboard, percussion, background vocals
 Laura Sisk – recording
 John Hanes – engineering
 Serban Ghenea – mixing

Charts

Certification

Notes

References

2020 songs
Taylor Swift songs
Jangle pop songs
Dream pop songs
Indie folk songs
Songs written by Taylor Swift
Songs written by Jack Antonoff
Song recordings produced by Taylor Swift
Song recordings produced by Jack Antonoff